Romney is an English surname. Notable people with the surname include:

Academics
George S. Romney (1874–1935), American university president
A. Kimball Romney (born 1925), American academic and anthropologist

Artists
George Romney (painter) (1734–1802), English portrait painter
John Romney (1785–1863), English engraver

Athletes
Baylor Romney, American football player
David Romney (born 1993), American soccer player
Elwood Romney (1911–1970), American basketball player and coach
Francis Romney (1873–1963), English cricketer
Dick Romney (1895–1969), American football coach
Milton Romney (1899–1975), American football player
G. Ott Romney (1892–1973), American football player and coach
Val Romney (1718–1773), English cricketer

Politicians
 Cyril Romney (1931–2007), Chief Minister of the British Virgin Islands from 1983 to 1986
 Romney family, a family prominent in U.S. politics
 G. Scott Romney (born 1941), Michigan Republican politician and lawyer
 Ann Romney (born 1949), former First Lady of Massachusetts
 George W. Romney (1907–1995), former CEO of American Motors, Governor of Michigan, and U.S. Secretary of Housing and Urban Development
 Lenore Romney (1908–1998), Michigan politician, former First Lady of Michigan
 Mitt Romney (born 1947), Republican politician, U.S. Senator for Utah, and former Governor of Massachusetts, and businessman
 Ronna Romney (born 1943), Michigan Republican politician and radio talk show host

Other people
Wavy Gravy or Hugh Romney (born 1936), American entertainer and peace activist
Marion G. Romney (1897–1988), American leader in the Church of Jesus Christ of Latter-day Saints
William Romney (died 1611), English merchant, governor of the East India Company

English-language surnames